Stop That Roach!, known in Japan as , is a Game Boy puzzle strategy video game by Koei.

Gameplay

The video game revolves around an insect exterminator who must kill roaches by any means possible. It is a 1994 video game remake of Koei's 1983 personal computer game Hoi Hoi (ホイホイ) for the NEC PC-8801 and Fujitsu FM-7. The Game Boy version allows the player to choose between a male hero (Ken) or a female hero (Lilly).

Similar in style to later tower defense games, the ultimate goal for all 100 levels is to protect confectionaries from the invading cockroaches. Each level is played out in a turn-based strategy manner. Players have four options: they can either attempt to walk into the next square, attempt to scare a cockroach, attempt to kill the cockroach or skip their current turn. Allowing the insects to succeed means that the player loses the round and has the choice of either retrying it or accepting a "game over." The game starts out as relatively simple, until the seventh round, where the complexity of the level design becomes an issue.

Reception
GamePro gave the game a positive review, summarizing it as "a very funny offbeat game." Game Players gave the game a rating of 56%.

References

External links
 Stop that Roach! at GameFAQs
 Stop that Roach! at MobyGames
 Stop that Roach!  at GB no Game Seiha Shimasho

1994 video games
Game Boy-only games
Koei games
Puzzle video games
Single-player video games
Top-down video games
Turn-based strategy video games
Game Boy games
Video games about insects
Video games developed in Japan